No Secrets is the only studio album by American girl group No Secrets. It was released on August 6, 2002, through Jive Records. The album spawned two singles, "Kids in America" (a cover of the Kim Wilde classic and also from the Nickelodeon original movie Jimmy Neutron: Boy Genius) and "That's What Girls Do" (from the end credits of the Cartoon Network original movie The Powerpuff Girls Movie, later featured on the soundtracks for The Hot Chick and Sleepover). No Secrets received poor reviews from critics and was a commercial disappointment.
Despite the album topping the US Billboard Top Heatseekers chart, the album only charted at No. 136 on the Billboard 200 and only stayed on the chart for three weeks.

Track listing

Charts

Notes 

2002 debut albums
No Secrets (musical group) albums